Brian Ritchie (born November 21, 1960) is the bass guitarist for the alternative rock band Violent Femmes. Ritchie was born and raised in the United States and is currently a dual citizen of the U.S. and Australia, with his full-time residence in Australia.

In addition to his bass playing, Ritchie is proficient at the shakuhachi, a Japanese bamboo flute. He acquired a Jun Shihan (shakuhachi teaching license) in March 2003 from James Nyoraku Schlefer, and his professional name is "Tairaku" ("big music" in Japanese).

Ritchie has released three solo albums: in 1987, "The Blend," in 1989, "Sonic Temple & Court of Babylon" and "I See A Noise" in 1990.

In 2007 Ritchie produced and toured with the Italian punk/folk band The Zen Circus, which subsequently changed its name to The Zen Circus and Brian Ritchie. The first international album of the band, Villa Inferno, was released in 2008 for the Italian record label Unhip Records.

In 2008, Ritchie and his wife, Varuni Kulasekera, moved to Hobart, Tasmania, Australia, where he has guested in a band called The Green Mist. Ritchie does most of his work in DV (David Vartanian) Studios.

On Australia Day 2012, Ritchie and his wife were naturalised as Australian citizens.

In 2009 he curated the first Mona Foma (MoFo) festival in Hobart, Tasmania. Since 2009 he has curated Mona Foma every year. At the 2012 MoFo, he organised an impromptu performance of the entire Violent Femmes first album by a 'super band' consisting of musicians playing at MoFo: the Dresden Dolls (Amanda Palmer, vocals, and Brian Viglione, drums), two musicians touring with PJ Harvey's band (Mick Harvey, guitar, and John Parish) and with Brian Ritchie himself on bass guitar and vibraphone.

In 2010 he toured as bassist with the Australian surf instrumental band called The Break, composed of Midnight Oil members Rob Hirst, Jim Moginie and Martin Rotsey.
 
Their debut album Church of the Open Sky was released on April 16, 2010 on the independent label Bombora, distributed by MGM.

In 2011 his home in Tasmania, designed by architect Stuart Tanner, was featured on the TV series Sandcastles.

Discography 
1987 – The Blend
1989 – Sonic Temple & Court of Babylon
1989 – Sun Ra – Man from Outer Space
1990 – I See a Noise
2004 – Shakuhachi Club NYC
2006 – Ryoanji
2007 – Taimu
2008 – Villa Inferno (with The Zen Circus)
2010 – Church of the Open Sky (with The Break)
 2011 – Tea Life (with Silas Be Ritchie)
 2012 – Tea Life 2 (with Silas Be Ritchie)
 2013 – Space Farm (with The Break)
 2013 – Tea Life 3 / Teenage Strangler 12" vinyl split (with Silas Be Ritchie)

References 

1960 births
Living people
American bass guitarists
Shakuhachi players
Guitarists from Wisconsin
Musicians from Milwaukee
American emigrants to Australia
Naturalised citizens of Australia
Violent Femmes members
American male guitarists
20th-century American guitarists
American male bass guitarists
20th-century flautists